Danilevich is the East-Slavic language variant of the  Polish-language surname Danilewicz originated in the noble Danielewicz family.

Notable people with the surname include:

Vladimir Danilevich (1924–2001), Soviet and Russian animator

East Slavic-language surnames